The 1927 World Chess Championship was played between José Raúl Capablanca and Alexander Alekhine, in Buenos Aires from September 16 to November 29, 1927. Alekhine, a Russian, became a naturalised French citizen during the match (on November 5).

Results

The first player to win six games would be World Champion. Some sources suggest the match would have been drawn and replayed if it reached a score of 5-5, but it is unclear whether this was the case.

Alekhine won the Championship, scoring +6−3=25.

References

External links
1927 World Chess Championship at the Internet Archive record of Graeme Cree's Chess Pages

1927
1927 in chess
1927 in Argentine sport
Chess in Argentina
Sports competitions in Buenos Aires
1920s in Buenos Aires
International chess competitions hosted by Argentina
September 1927 sports events
October 1927 sports events
November 1927 sports events